The Electoral Disabilities (Military Service) Removal Act 1900 (63 & 64 Vict. c.8), long title An Act to remove Electoral Disabilities which may arise in the case of Members of the Reserve, Militia, and Yeomanry Forces, and in the case of Volunteers, by reason of absence on the Military Service of the Crown, was an Act of Parliament of the Parliament of the United Kingdom, given the Royal Assent on 25 May 1900 and repealed in 1908.

It held that any person on active service as part of the reserves, volunteers, yeomanry or militia, and as a result not fulfilling the residency requirement for electoral registration, was not to be disqualified from registration for this reason alone. It also provided that they were not to be disqualified if their wife or their children had received poor relief during such an absence.

The Act was specifically stipulated to only apply during the duration of the South African War, though it applied to any absence on active service, whether overseas or on service within the United Kingdom. "Volunteer" applied generally, to any person enlisted for temporary service for the purposes of the war.

The Act was repealed by the Statute Law Revision Act 1908, though it had by this point ceased to have any effect.

References
The public general acts passed in the sixty-third and sixty-third and sixty-fourth years of the reign of her majesty Queen Victoria. London: printed for Her Majesty's Stationery Office. 1900.
Chronological table of the statutes; HMSO, London. 1993.

United Kingdom Acts of Parliament 1900
Election law in the United Kingdom
United Kingdom military law
Repealed United Kingdom Acts of Parliament
Election legislation
Second Boer War